Eagle Creek Township may refer to the following townships in the United States:

 Eagle Creek Township, Gallatin County, Illinois
 Eagle Creek Township, Lake County, Indiana